Cookie is a children's novel written by English author Jacqueline Wilson, published in October 2008 by Doubleday. It is illustrated, as are most of her books, by Nick Sharratt. The book was released on 9 October 2008.

The book was age-banded (as "9+") by the publisher, despite Wilson's opposition to the practice.

Plot
Despite her name, Beauty Cookson is a plain, timid girl who is nicknamed "ugly" by her peers at school, especially by her main bully, Skye. Worse than the teasing in the playground, though, is the unpredictable criticism from her emotionally abusive father, Gerry Cookson. She is frequently berated for breaking any of his house rules, as well as for her lack of looks and confidence, even though she is a wealthy girl who lives in a large, beautifully decorated house and attends a private school. Her only source of kindness at home is her mother, Dilys "Dilly" Cookson. Beauty adores rabbits, although Gerry forbids her from having pets. Her favorite television show is "Rabbit Hutch", a show for young children about a man, Sam, and his pet rabbit, Lily.

Beauty has no friends at all at school. The only student that is nice to her is Rhona, Skye's best friend. However, Rhona desperately wants to be friends with Beauty, which she reveals one day when Skye is at a dentist appointment. Finally, Beauty is invited to a birthday party Rhona is holding. For the birthday party, Gerry forces her to get corkscrew curls, and popular bullies Skye, Arabella and Emily develop a new nickname for her: Ugly Corkscrew.

Beauty tells her mother about the teasing and Dilly decides to learn how to bake cookies, even though she is an awful cook, in the hope that Beauty will be given a new nickname, Cookie (a play on her surname, Cookson). Gradually, both Beauty and Dilly get the hang of making cookies and become wondrous at it. Gerry refuses to acknowledge any of this completely doubting Dilly's ability to cook anything at all. 

Beauty's birthday is approaching and she is dreading it, however Gerry appears to turn over a new leaf and act like an ideal father. Gerry arranges a birthday feast and organizes tickets for all of the girls in her class to see a stage show called 'Birthday Bonanza', with a chauffeur driven limousine to escort them there. Her mother buys a beautiful Victorian-style dress for her, and Beauty invites all the girls, including Skye, and Dilly decides to give out cookies at the end of the party, which Gerry spitefully crushes into crumbs. Rhona gives Beauty a pet rabbit, which she names 'Birthday'. The party soon becomes miserable when, at the show, Beauty feels too shy to go onstage (the show is to celebrate people's birthdays), and Gerry shouts at her in the limousine after all the girls leave.

When Dilly and Beauty learn that Birthday has been killed by a fox after Gerry deliberately let him out of his hutch, Dilly decides to separate from him, and she and Beauty pack their things and leave the house. The two drive to Gerry's first wife, Avril, who treats the two kindly but at first looks down upon Dilly's decision to leave Gerry, saying that she has "deliberately made herself homeless". She lets them stay for the night until they decide to go on holiday. The holiday resort to which they go is called Rabbit Cove, which Beauty chooses due to her love of rabbits. They find their way to an idyllic seaside resort run by a kind older man named Mike, a painter who takes Dilly on as a breakfast chef in his B&B.

Dilly decides to let Gerry know where they are, despite Beauty's objections, but after he shouts at her and calls her a "useless aging dumb blonde" she terminates the call. Gerry tracks them down, and yells at them in front of the customers at the café, even going as far as to accuse Dilly of having an affair with Mike and then to punch him in the nose, before driving off. Even though Dilly is living with Mike and he hints that he wants to start dating, Dilly refuses for the time being, as she wants to be independent. He understands.

Just before summer, Beauty is sent to a new school which she is adamant against at first, until she eventually agrees. At the school she makes friends and is nicknamed the Cookie Girl, but she still keeps in touch with Rhona by writing letters. Beauty is asked to go on 'Watchbox', a talent show that Skye really wanted to be on, due to the rise in popularity of her mother's cookies. As a treat, the producers of Watchbox invite Sam, who tells Beauty that his rabbit, Lily, is pregnant. Sam decides to give Beauty her own baby rabbit.

Characters
 Beauty Cookson: Main character; though timid little girl, she has a sweet personality and adores rabbits and the kids show called "Rabbit Hutch" starring Sam and his rabbit Lily.
 Dilly Cookson: Beauty's caring mother who struggles standing up to her cruel husband, but does her best with looking after Beauty.
 Gerry Cookson: Beauty's completely evil, vile, abusive and controlling father who has no good in him and emotionally abuses his wife and daughter.
 Rhona: The only classmate who is nice to Beauty but is unable to be her best friend as she already best friends with Skye though she wishes otherwise.
 Skye: A rude girl in Beauty's class who takes pleasure in bullying Beauty and calling her nasty names like "Ugly".
 Mike: A kind painter who owns a B&B House on Rabbit Cove and takes Beauty and Dilly under his wing.
 Avril: Gerry's first ex wife.

Audiobook
A BBC audiobook was released in the same month as the novel, read by Finty Williams.

References

2008 British novels
Doubleday (publisher) books
Novels about bullying
Novels about child abuse
Novels by Jacqueline Wilson
Cookies in popular culture